Diaixidae is a family of copepods belonging to the order Calanoida.

Genera:
 Anawekia Othman & Greenwood, 1994
 Diaixis Sars, 1902
 Pogonura Komeda & Ohtsuka, 2020
 Procenognatha Markhaseva & Schulz, 2010
 Ranthaxus Markhaseva & Schulz, 2010
 Sensiava Markhaseva & Schulz, 2006
 Thoxancalanus Markhaseva, Laakmann & Renz, 2014
 Vensiasa Markhaseva, 2015
 Xancithrix Markhaseva, 2012

References

Copepods